Aeneas Simon Mackay, 15th Lord Reay, Baron Mackay (pronounced "Ray"; born 20 March 1965), a Scottish lord and Dutch nobleman, is a British corporate financier who is also hereditary Clan Chief of Clan Mackay.  In the Netherlands he is Lord of Ophemert and Zennewijnen, with castle Ophemert.

Life
Educated at Westminster School and Brown University, Lord Reay was a founding partner of the corporate finance firm Montrose Partners.

Lord Reay was admitted to the House of Lords in January 2019, after winning a hereditary peers' by-election. He sits as a Conservative member of the House.

Family
The then Master of Reay married to Mia Ruulio from Finland, elder daughter of Markus Ruulio, in 2010. Lord and Lady Reay live in Chelsea SW3 and Whittington Hall, and have three children:

 Alexander Mackay (b. 2010), styled Master of Reay; 
The Hon Iona Mackay (b. 2011);
The Hon Harry Mackay (b. 2014).

See also
 Clan Mackay
 Lords of Parliament

Further reading
 Burke's Peerage & Baronetage

References

External links
 Profile at  UK Parliament Website

1965 births
Living people
Conservative Party (UK) hereditary peers
Eldest sons of British hereditary barons
Mackay, Aeneas
People educated at Westminster School, London
Brown University alumni
Lords Reay
Hereditary peers elected under the House of Lords Act 1999